Lewsze  is a village in the administrative district of Gmina Michałowo, within Białystok County, Podlaskie Voivodeship, in northeastern Poland, near the border with Belarus.

References

Lewsze